Supriya Pathak (born 7 January 1961) is an Indian actress who works in Gujarati and Hindi films and television. She garnered widespread recognition and acclaim with her portrayal of Hansa Parekh in the Khichdi franchise. She won three Filmfare Awards for Best Supporting Actress for her performances in the crime drama Kalyug (1981), the drama Bazaar (1982) and the tragic romance Goliyon Ki Raasleela Ram-Leela (2013), in addition to receiving Filmfare nominations in the same category for her performances in the coming-of-age comedy-drama Wake Up Sid (2009) and the comedy film Khichdi: The Movie (2010). For her performance in the family drama Ramprasad Ki Tehrvi (2021), she earned a nomination for the Filmfare Award for Best Actress (Critics).

Daughter of actress Dina Pathak, she married her second husband, actor Pankaj Kapur in 1988, with whom she has a daughter and a son. Her sister is actress Ratna Pathak Shah, who is married to actor  Naseeruddin Shah. Actor Shahid Kapoor is her step-son.

Early life 
Supriya was born on 7 January 1961 to Kathiyawadi Gujarati theater artiste, and veteran actor, Dina Pathak and a Punjabi father, Baldev Pathak, dressmaker to the stars Rajesh Khanna and Dilip Kumar. She has one elder sister, Ratna Pathak, also a theatre and film actor. She grew up in Parsi Colony in Dadar, Mumbai, and attended the J. B. Vachha High school. She has a bachelor's degree in Fine art, specialising in Bharatanatyam, from the Nalanda Dance Research Centre, University of Mumbai.

Career
Pathak's first foray into acting was under her mother's direction with the revival of the play Maina Gurjari, which Dina Pathak had acted in previously. This was followed by a play with Dinesh Thakur titled Biwiyon Ka Madersa (based on a play by French playwright Molière), which was staged at the Prithvi Theatre. It was here that Jennifer Kendall (the late wife of Shashi Kapoor) spotted her and recommended her to Shyam Benegal for their home production Kalyug (1981), an adaptation of the epic Mahabharata. Her portrayal of Subhadra won her the Filmfare Award for Best Supporting Actress. She then performed in Vijeta (1982), Bazaar (1982), Masoom (1983) and Mirch Masala (1985). She had a minor role in the biopic Gandhi (1982) and starred in the 1988 French film, The Bengali Night. She appeared in Raakh in 1989. In 1985 she played title role in Malayalam movie Akalathe Ambili.

Her television roles include Idhar Udhar, Ek Mahal Ho Sapno Ka, Khichdi, Baa Bahoo Aur Baby and Chanchan among others.

In 1994, her husband, Pankaj Kapur and she launched their own TV production house, Grass Company. Mohandas B.A.L.L.B was the first serial they produced and acted in, under the banner.

After an 11-year hiatus from acting, she starred in the 2005 film Sarkar, followed by its sequel, Sarkar Raj in 2008. She portrayed a subservient mother who tries hard to fill the generation gap with her son in Wake Up Sid (2009).  Filmfare magazine called her rendering of the sinister Dhankor Baa in 2013's Goliyon Ki Raasleela Ram-Leela as the "watershed of her career". Carry On Kesar (2016) was her first Gujarati film.

Personal life 

At 22, Pathak married. but they separated within a year. In 1986, she met her second husband Pankaj Kapur, while filming Agla Mausam (1989). After two years of courtship, they married in 1988, and are parents to a daughter and a son.

Filmography

Films

Television

Web series

Awards and nominations

References

External links

 
 

Living people
1961 births
Gujarati people
Indian film actresses
Indian soap opera actresses
Indian television actresses
Indian stage actresses
Actresses in Hindi cinema
Actresses in Malayalam cinema
Actresses in Telugu cinema
Actresses in Gujarati cinema
Filmfare Awards winners
Zee Cine Awards winners
20th-century Indian actresses
21st-century Indian actresses